Steve Bubacarr Trawally (born 10 November 1994) is a Gambian professional footballer who plays as a forward for Hammarby IF in the Swedish Allsvenskan and the Gambia national team.

Club career
On 12 January 2015, Trawally transferred to Chinese Super League side Hangzhou Greentown. He was then loaned to China League One side Yanbian Changbaishan until the end of the season. On 14 March 2015, Trawally made his debut for Yanbian in the first round of the season against Jiangxi Liansheng. He scored his first goal in China in the 52nd minute, which ensured Yanbian's 1–0 victory. On 23 May 2015, he was sent off by waving the finger towards opponent in a league match against Tianjin Songjiang, which resulted in a ban of 4 matches and him being fined ¥20,000. Trawally scored his first hat-trick in China on 18 July 2015, in a 4–2 win against Guizhou Hengfeng Zhicheng. He scored another hat-trick on 8 August 2015, in a 6–1 victory against Xinjiang Tianshan Leopard. Trawally scored 17 goals in 26 appearances in the 2015 season, as Yanbian Changbaishan won the title of the league and promoted to the first tier. 

Trawally made a permanent transfer to Yanbian Fude on 13 February 2016. On 11 March 2016, he made his Super League debut in the second match of 2016 season against Jiangsu Suning, coming on as a substitute for Nikola Petković in the 88th minute. Trawally scored eight goals in 26 appearances in the 2016 season which secured Yanbian's stay in the top flight for the next season. He extended his contract for another two years in February 2017. Trawally continued his promising performances in the 2017 season, scoring 18 goals for the club, including two hat-tricks against Beijing Sinobo Guoan and Guangzhou Evergrande Taobao.

Trawally left for another top-tier club Guizhou Hengfeng on free via Danish club Vejle Boldklub following Yanbian's relegation in the 2017 season. On 9 February 2018, Yanbian made an official statement that Trawally was under contract with the club and disapproved his transfer. The disagreement eventually solved on 28 February 2018, the final day of 2018 Chinese football transfer winter window, after Guizhou Hengfeng paid his transfer fee. Trawally made his debut and scored his first goal for the club on 4 March 2018 in a 3–1 loss against Jiangsu Suning.

In February 2019, he moved to Saudi club Al-Shabab. He was loaned to Emirati side Ajman Club in September the same year.

On 31 March 2022, Trawally transferred to Hammarby IF in the Swedish Allsvenskan, signing a two-year contract. Trawally featured in the final of the 2021–22 Svenska Cupen, in which Hammarby lost by 4–5 on penalties to Malmö FF after the game ended in a 0–0 draw.

International career 
On 6 September 2015, Trawally made his debut for Gambia in a 2017 Africa Cup of Nations qualification match against Cameroon coming on as a substitute for Pa Amat Dibba in the 64th minute.

Career statistics

Club

International

Statistics accurate as of match played 10 April 2022

Honours
Real de Banjul
 Gambian Championnat National D1: 2012, 2014
 Gambian Super Cup: 2012
Yanbian Changbaishan 
 China League One: 2015
Individual
 Gambian Championnat National D1 top scorer: 2014

References

External links
 
 

1994 births
Living people
Association football forwards
Gambian footballers
The Gambia international footballers
The Gambia youth international footballers
Gambian expatriate footballers
Real de Banjul FC players
Zhejiang Professional F.C. players
Yanbian Funde F.C. players
Vejle Boldklub players
Guizhou F.C. players
Al-Shabab FC (Riyadh) players
Ajman Club players
Hammarby Fotboll players
China League One players
Chinese Super League players
Saudi Professional League players
UAE Pro League players
Allsvenskan players
2021 Africa Cup of Nations players
Expatriate footballers in China
Expatriate footballers in Saudi Arabia
Expatriate footballers in the United Arab Emirates
Expatriate footballers in Sweden
Gambian expatriate sportspeople in Saudi Arabia